Mangrove oyster is a common name for several oysters that live on mangrove roots and may refer to:

Crassostrea rhizophorae
Crassostrea tulipa

Mollusc common names